Ernest Graves (May 5, 1919 – June 1, 1983) was an American actor.

Born in Chicago, Graves was a regular on the NBC drama Today Is Ours (1958). He also was featured on several daytime soap operas, including Guiding Light, The Edge of Night, As the World Turns, and Another World.  He starred as Zeus in the cult film Hercules in New York in 1970 and the TV movie adaptation of The Ceremony of Innocence. Graves is most remembered for his portrayal of the original Victor Lord on the ABC daytime drama One Life to Live from 1968 to 1974. He starred in the 1976 Broadway play Poor Murderer.

On June 1, 1983, Graves died of cancer at age 64 at Memorial Sloan-Kettering Cancer Center in New York.

Filmography

References

External links

1919 births
1983 deaths
Male actors from Chicago
American male soap opera actors
American male television actors
20th-century American male actors